The 1989 Swedish Golf Tour was the fourth season of the Swedish Golf Tour, a series of professional golf tournaments for women held in Sweden and Denmark.

The tour shared Tournament Directors with the 1988 Swedish Golf Tour, Arne Andersson, Bengt Norström and Claes Grönberg. The player council consisted of Pia Nilsson, Maria Lindbladh, Viveca Hoff and Liv Wollin. 

Tournaments were played over 54 holes with no cut, the SI and LET events over 72 holes with cuts. The Grundig Team Trophy was a limited field best ball event played over 36 holes.

Schedule
The season consisted of 12 tournaments played between May and September, where two events were included on the 1989 Ladies European Tour.

Order of Merit
The sponsored name was the ICA-Kuriren Order of Merit.

Source:

See also
1989 Swedish Golf Tour (men's tour)

References

External links
Official homepage of the Swedish Golf Tour

Swedish Golf Tour (women)
Swedish Golf Tour (women)